Zeki as Turkish masculine name and may refer to:

 Zeki Yim (born 2003), Hong Kong Pornography actor
 Zeki Akar (born 1944), Turkish judge
 Zeki Alasya (1943-2015), Turkish actor
 Zeki Demir (born 1982), Turkish karateka
 Zeki Demirkubuz (born 1964), Turkish film director
 Zeki Gülay (born 1972), Turkish basketball player
 Zeki Kuneralp (1914–1998), Turkish diplomat
 Zeki Müren (1931–1996), Turkish singer
 Zeki Ökten (1941–2009), Turkish film director
 Zeki Önder Özen (born 1969), Turkish footballer
 Zeki Pasha (1862-1943), Ottoman Turkish field marshal
 Zeki Rıza Sporel, (1898–1969), Turkish footballer
 Zeki Sezer, Turkish  politician
 Zeki Üngör (1880–1958), Turkish composer
 Zeki Velidi Togan (1890-1970), Turkologist and historian of Bashkir origin
 Zeki Ozyilmaz (born 1989), Soldier of the Year for the 1/69th Infantry Regiment of the US Army in 2013
 Zeki Yavru (born 1991), Turkish footballer

As a surname:
 Semir Zeki, neuroscientist

As a nickname:
 Salih Zeki, mathematician

See also

 Zaki

Turkish masculine given names